Table tennis at the 2005 Southeast Asian Games took place in the Ninoy Aquino Stadium, Rizal Memorial Sports Complex in Malate, Manila, Philippines. The participants were competing to win at least one of the 7 gold medals at stake.

Medal tally

Medalists

External links
Southeast Asian Games Official Results

2005 Southeast Asian Games events
2005
Table tennis competitions in the Philippines
2005 in table tennis
Manila